The following were moose in the Moose in the City program in Toronto, Ontario in 2000.

List of moose

Moose on the Move
 Majestic Moose
 Blue Moose
 Moose Transit Commission
 Coffee "Mousse"
 Bruce the Moose
 Get Your Hooves on the Street

Canadian Diplomats
 Buffalo Moose
 Chicago Moose
 Moollennium Moose
 Oh' Canada
 Pizza Moose0
 Sydney Moose
 Trillium Moose

References

External links
 
 
 
 
 

Public art in Toronto
Outdoor sculptures in Canada
Painted statue public art